A labret is a form of body piercing. Taken literally, it is any type of adornment that is attached to the lip (labrum). However, the term usually refers to a piercing that is below the bottom lip, above the chin.  It is sometimes referred to as a "tongue pillar" or a "soul patch piercing".

Pronunciation

It derives from the Latin labrum "lip" and the diminutive suffix -et. However, many in the body-piercing industry give it the pseudo-French pronunciation  , though the French word is in fact borrowed from the English.

Anthropology

The labret was a traditional piercing among the American Northwest Coast Indians, where it was related to status:

"access to labrets. After 3,000 BP, a divergence in labret wear in north and south coasts. In the north from 1500 - 3500 BP, more labrets worn by males. After 1500 BP, labrets worn by females. In the south, between 2000 - 3500 BP, worn by males and females, but from 2000 BP on, labrets generally disappear and are replaced by cranial deformation by free males and females of whatever class (e.g. elite or commoner). So, for 4,000 years on the northwest coast, it was important to distinguish certain individuals in a very direct manner; either by cranial deformation or by labret wear. Gender and geographical region may also be identified by these methods."

When a mask was being made to represent someone of high status, that mask would likewise have a labret.

The wearing of labrets was widely observed among Tlingit women of high status at the time of European and American arrivals in Southeast Alaska. The Russian term for the Tlingit, Koloshi, derived from an Alutiiq word for labret.

Based on analysis of the history and social context of the labret (lip plug) on the Northwest Coast of British Columbia over the last 5,000 years, Marina LaSalle asserts that "while simple correlations of the labret with 'status' and 'gender' are not wrong, nonetheless they betray the complexity of body ornamentation which, though manifested materially, is highly contextual" and that "the labret is a symbol and expression of social identity that continues to hold significant meaning for the descendants of this heritage."

Types of labret piercings

In contemporary styles, there are several different labret variations based on precisely where the piercing is positioned on the lower lip. These include a vertical labret (pierced with a curved barbell through the top of the lower lip rather than in front of the lip tissue), snake bites (dual piercings close together reminiscent of fangs), spiderbites (dual piercings very close together on the same side of the face), and a lowbret, which is placed as low as possible toward the chin.
The initial piercing is usually done at 1.2, 1.6 or 2.0 mm diameter. After initial healing, the piercing can be (gradually) further stretched. Some people choose to stretch to sizes over 10 mm, and the jewelry worn at these larger sizes is usually a round or oval 'labret plug'.

See also
 Body piercing aftercare
 Lip piercing
 Lip plate
Tembetá

References

External links

BMEZine: Lip Piercing
BMEZine: Labret Piercing
BMEZine: Labret Stud
Plughog.com: Labret Stretching Guide

Facial piercings
Body piercing jewellery